Anthomyia ochripes is a species of root-maggot fly in the family Anthomyiidae.

References

Anthomyiidae
Articles created by Qbugbot
Flies described in 1758
Taxa named by Carl Linnaeus